Lucy Bell (born 23 December 1968) is an English-born Australian actress who appears in Australian television and film. She is the daughter of Australian actor/director John Bell. Her partner is James O'Loghlin and they have three daughters.

Career

Television 
Bell began her career in 1981, having a guest role in A Town Like Alice. She appeared in several shows as a guest role for a number of years, before having a lead role in Snowy in 1993. From 1994 until 1996, she had a leading role in G.P.. She also had a role in Murder Call from 1997 until 2000. In 2003, she starred in Grass Roots. In 2006 and 2007, Bell had a recurring role in All Saints, and had a leading role in 2009 in Dirt Game.

Film 
In 1994, Bell starred as Mary McKillop in the 1994 movie Mary. Also in 1997, she also appeared in the film Oscar and Lucinda and starred alongside Nick Giannopoulos in The Wog Boy in 2000. In 2008, she had a role in Ten Empty and The Square.

References 

1968 births
Living people
English emigrants to Australia
Australian television actresses
People educated at Sydney Girls High School